Atoms for Peace were an English-American supergroup comprising the Radiohead songwriter Thom Yorke (vocals, guitar, piano), the Red Hot Chili Peppers bassist Flea, Radiohead's producer Nigel Godrich (keyboards, synthesisers, guitars), the drummer Joey Waronker of Beck and R.E.M., and the percussionist Mauro Refosco. 

Yorke formed Atoms for Peace in 2009 to perform songs from his debut solo album, The Eraser (2006); they toured in 2010. In 2013, they released an album, Amok, the product of combining Yorke's electronic music with the band's jamming. It received mainly positive reviews, with several critics likening it to Yorke's solo work. Amok was followed by a tour of Europe, the US and Japan.

History

2006–2009: Background and formation 
In 2006, the Radiohead songwriter Thom Yorke released his first solo album, The Eraser, comprising mostly electronic music. It was produced by Radiohead's producer, Nigel Godrich. In 2009, Yorke performed solo at Latitude Festival, and found it was possible to perform Eraser songs on acoustic instruments. He contacted Godrich with the idea of forming a band to perform The Eraser without sequencers, reproducing the electronic beats with Latin percussion. 

Yorke and Godrich formed Atoms for Peace in 2009 with the bassist Flea of the Red Hot Chili Peppers; the drummer Joey Waronker, who had performed with acts including Beck and R.E.M; and the percussionist Mauro Refosco, who had performed with acts including David Byrne. Yorke said: "I've been playing with [Radiohead] since I was 16, and to do this was quite a trip ... It felt like we'd knocked a hole in a wall, and we should just fucking go through it."

2009–2010: First performances 
The band went unnamed for early performances, billed as "Thom Yorke" or "??????". In February 2010, they announced an American tour and the name Atoms for Peace. The name is taken from a song title from The Eraser, which references the 1953 speech by American President Dwight D. Eisenhower. Along with Eraser songs, Atoms for Peace performed the 2003 Radiohead B-side "Paperbag Writer" and the 1998 single "Rabbit in Your Headlights", a collaboration with Yorke and Unkle.

2013: Amok 

After the tour, Atoms for Peace spent three days jamming and recording in Los Angeles. Yorke and Godrich edited and arranged the recordings over two years, combining it with Yorke's electronic music. This became the band's debut album, Amok, released on February 25, 2013, through XL Recordings. It received mainly positive reviews, with critics likening it to Yorke's solo work.

Amok was followed by a tour of Europe, the US and Japan. The tour included performances Yorke's 2009 single "FeelingPulledApartByHorses". In 2013, Yorke wrote that determining whether new songs were for Radiohead or Atoms for Peace was a "grey area" and depended on which musicians he is sampling.

Later activity 
In 2015, Yorke and Flea performed "Atoms for Peace" on the French television show Le Grand Journal and performed "Default" at the Paris United Nations Climate Change Conference. In 2018, Atoms for Peace reunited without Refosco to perform the song "Atoms for Peace" at a solo Thom Yorke show in Los Angeles. Flea provided trumpet for Yorke's song "Daily Battles" for the 2019 film Motherless Brooklyn, and Waronker contributed drums to one song on Yorke's album Anima (2019). Waronker and Refosco formed a new group, Jomoro, and released their debut album, Blue Marble Sky, on 4 June 2021.

Members

Thom Yorke – lead vocals, guitars, piano, keyboards, percussion
Flea – bass guitar, melodica, keyboards
Nigel Godrich – keyboards, synthesisers, guitars, percussion, backing vocals
Mauro Refosco – percussion, additional drums, marimba
Joey Waronker – drums

Discography

Studio albums

Singles

Music videos

References

External links

 

Alternative rock groups from California
Electronic music groups from California
American experimental rock groups
Musical groups established in 2009
Radiohead
Rock music supergroups
XL Recordings artists
Musical groups from Los Angeles
2009 establishments in California
Musical quintets